George Lincoln Thompson (November 22, 1864 – September 1, 1941) was an American politician from New York.

Life
He was the son of Richmond Ansel Thompson and Annie Elizabeth (Handshaw) Thompson. On June 12, 1894, he married Lottie F. Scott.

Thompson was a member of the New York State Assembly (Suffolk Co., 2nd D.) in 1909, 1910 and 1912; and was Chairman of the Committee on Public Institutions in 1912.

He was a member of the New York State Senate (1st D.) from 1915 until his death in 1941, sitting in the 138th, 139th, 140th, 141st, 142nd, 143rd, 144th, 145th, 146th, 147th, 148th, 149th, 150th, 151st, 152nd, 153rd, 154th, 155th, 156th, 157th, 158th, 159th, 160th, 161st, 162nd and 163rd New York State Legislatures.

He died on September 1, 1941, at his home in Kings Park, New York, of a heart attack; and was buried at the Episcopal Church Graveyard in St. James, New York.

Sources
 Official New York from Cleveland to Hughes by Charles Elliott Fitch (Hurd Publishing Co., New York and Buffalo, 1911, Vol. IV; pg. 358f)
 G. THOMPSON DIES; STATE SENATOR, 76 in NYT on September 2, 1941 (subscription required)
 Thompson genealogy at Long Island genealogy

External links

1864 births
1941 deaths
Republican Party New York (state) state senators
People from Smithtown, New York
Republican Party members of the New York State Assembly
People from Kings Park, New York